Allan Watson (born 3 August 1948) was a Scottish footballer who played for Dumbarton.

References

1948 births
Scottish footballers
Dumbarton F.C. players
Scottish Football League players
Living people
Association football outside forwards